Daggett School District is a public school district in Daggett County, Utah, United States. The district provides education for students living in Daggett County, as well as more than two dozen students from adjacent areas in Wyoming. It is the smallest of the 41 school districts in Utah, with a total of three schools and 181 students.

Description
Daggett School District operates shelter Pre-K programs (for students age 3–5 who qualify for an Individualized Education Program (IEP) at each elementary school.

The district hosts a remote site of Utah State University's Distance Education system, which provides concurrent (dual) enrollment for high school students as well as post-secondary courses for adults. Uintah Basin Technical College also offers limited courses at Manila High School.

The superintendent of the district is Dr. Bruce Northcott. Business manager is Sue Olorenshaw. School board members include Pat Asbill (President), Marcia Barber (Vice President), James Olsen, Roxann Reid and Sarah Wilson (appointed Dec 2017). Board members are elected for a term of four years, from precincts established by the county commission.

History
Daggett School District, originally called Daggett County School District, was formed when Daggett County split from Uintah County, Utah in 1914. The split was necessary as Utah State law requires each county to have at least one school district.

Communities served
In addition to several remote areas in Daggett County (as well as some areas of Sweetwater and Uinta counties in Wyoming), Daggett School District serves the following communities:

 Dutch John
 Manila

Schools

See also

 List of school districts in Utah
 Northeastern Utah Educational Services

Notes

References

External links 
 

School districts in Utah
Education in Daggett County, Utah